The Mystic Tide were an American rock band who have been credited for creating some of the first psychedelic anthems.  Despite their lack of commercial success, they are now highly regarded amongst followers of garage rock and are recognized for their innovative musical approach.

The group formed on Long Island and released a total of four singles between 1965 and 1967, all of which were written by the band's guitar player, Joe Docko. The band broke up in 1967 after little commercial success. Many years later in 1994 Docko recorded some new material and that along with three demos, the band's five original singles, and their B-sides would be put out as a CD by Distortions records. Released more than 25 years after the group had disbanded, Solid Sound/Solid Ground, was the first and only album the band ever made.

Discography

Singles/acetates

I Wouldn't Care (unissued acetate - Ultrasonic, 1965) 
"Stay Away" b/w "Why" (Esquire 4677, October 1966)
"Mystic Eyes" b/w "I Search For A New Love" (Esquire 719/720, December 1966)
"Frustration" b/w "Psychedelic Journey (Part 1)" (Solid Sound WB 156/7, March 1967)
"Running Through The Night" b/w "Psychedelic Journey Pt 2" (Solid Sound 158/9, April 1967)
"Mystery Ship" b/w "You Won't Look Back" (Solid Sound 321/2, August 1967

Compilation albums
Acid Dreams (Past & Present) 1979
E-Types vs. Mystic Tide LP (Eva EVA 12037) 1983
It Comes Now LP (Distortions DB 1006) 1991
Solid Sound/Solid Ground (Distortions DR 1006) 1994

References

Notes

Garage rock groups from New York (state)
Musical groups from Long Island
Psychedelic rock music groups from New York (state)